Nicholas Morgan could refer to: 

 Nicky Morgan (footballer) (born 1959), English footballer
 Nicholas Morgan (shot putter), English shot putter
 Nick Morgan (born 1963), American speaking coach